Abdullah Goth is one of the neighbourhoods of Bin Qasim Town in Karachi, Sindh, Pakistan.

References

External links 
 Karachi Website.

Neighbourhoods of Karachi
Bin Qasim Town